The bearded eelpout (Lyconema barbatum) is a species of marine ray-finned fish belonging to the family Zoarcidae, the eelpouts. This species is the only species in the monospecific genus Lyconema. It is found in the eastern Pacific Ocean.

Taxonomy
The bearded eelpout was first formally described in 1896 by the American ichthyologist Charles Henry Gilbert with its type locality given as off central California. Gilbert also described a new monospecific genus, Lyconema, when he described the bearded eelpout. This taxon is classified within the subfamily Lycodinae, one of 4 subfamilies in the family Zoarcidae, the eelpouts.

Etymology
The bearded eelpout's genus name is a combination of lyco, in reference to Lycodes, meaning that this taxonm is similar to that one, but has its lower jaw furnishes with a dense mass of slender filaments or barbels, nema meaning thread. The specific name barbatum means "bearded" in another allusion to the filaments on the lower jaw.

Description
The bearded eelpout has 9 or 10 suborbital bones and a cephalic sensory canal with 9 pores. The are 2 parallel lines of cirri on the lower jaw and. in adults, these often extend back as far as the branchiostegal region. They have 2 fin rays in the pelvic fin. The body is covered in small scales, there are two small pyloric caecae and a lateral line. There are small on sexually dimorphic teeth in the jaws and there are vomerine teeth and palatine teeth.

Distribution and habitat
The bearded eelpout is found in the eastern Pacific Ocean from off southern Oregon south to central Baja California, Mexico.

References

Lycodinae